FAKEVOX is the debut album by Japanese electronic music band Plus-Tech Squeeze Box, which was released in Japan on September 15, 2000, and in the United Kingdom on January 7, 2002. It was later re-released in Japan on April 15, 2005 with a different bonus track and included a music video.

Track listing

Original Japanese release

Channel No.17
Early RISER
A Day in the Radio
Test Room
Rocket coaster
Scene1-launch a spaceship into space →
☆
White Drops
MILK TEA
Scene2-citybilly lived happily ever after →
Sneaker Song!
Clover
Rocket coaster (Fab Cushion Remix)
A Day In The Radio (micro mach machine Remix)

English release

Channel No.17
Early Riser
A Day in the Radio
Test Room
Rocket Coaster
Scene 1-Launch a Spaceship Into Space
☆
White Drops
Milk Tea
Scene 2-Citybilly Lived Happily Ever After
Sneaker Song
Clover

Japanese re-release (2005) [VMSD-007]

Channel No.17 [1:17]
early RISER [2:48]
A Day in the Radio [3:34]
Test Room [3:45]
rocket coaster [3:05]
Scene1-launch a spaceship into space → [0:28]
☆ [4:12]
White Drops [3:05]
MILK TEA [3:19]
Scene2-citybilly lived happily after → [1:03]
Sneaker Song! [3:43]
clover [2:36]
kitchen shock → [Pancake Partymix] [5:17] (bonus track)

bonus video clip: early RISER

References

Plus-Tech Squeeze Box albums
2000 debut albums